Karontha (Karountha) is a village in Rohtak mandal of the Rohtak district, in the Indian state of Haryana.  It is on Rohtak Jhajjar road.

Demographics
As of 2011 India census, Karountha had a population of 5802 in 1139 households. Males (3159) constitute 54.44%  of the population and females (2643) 45.55%.

References

Villages in Rohtak district